Scotch Meadows is an unincorporated community and census-designated place in Scotland County, North Carolina, United States. Its population was 580 as of the 2010 census.

Geography

Demographics

References

Unincorporated communities in Scotland County, North Carolina
Unincorporated communities in North Carolina
Census-designated places in Scotland County, North Carolina
Census-designated places in North Carolina